Isa Ibrahim (born in 1935) is a politician from Brunei who currently serves as the Special Adviser to His Majesty the Sultan and Yang Di-Pertuan and Minister at the Prime Minister's Office since 30 January 2018.

He had a career in the government service of Brunei, holding a number of important positions such as Deputy Attorney general, Deputy Menteri Besar (Chief Minister), Special Adviser to the sultan, General Adviser to the sultan, Minister of Home Affairs, and speaker of the Legislative Council. He received his legal training at Southampton University and is a certified barrister as well as an honorary fellow of Magdalene College in Cambridge.

Early life and education 
Isa is born in 1935, to Ibrahim Mohammad Jahfar (former Menteri Bear of Brunei). In July 1961, he obtained his B.A. Honours in Law from the University of Southampton, England, and would become a Barrister-at-Law with the Middle Temple, London in February 1962. The University of Southampton awarded an honorary doctorate of laws (LLD) to the recipient in July 1995.

Political career 
On 21 February 1953, the inaugural Sarawak–North–Borneo–Brunei Conference took place in Kuching. Sultan Omar Ali Saifuddien III, British Resident John Coleraine Hanbury Barcroft, and Secretary Isa Ibrahim were present on behalf of Brunei. To assure the Conference's success and validity, the High Commissioners Anthony Abell and Malcom MacDonald personally persuaded the Sultan to join.

In March 1962, Isa joined Government service as Assisting Counsel and Deputy Public Prosecutor in the Legal Department. Then from April to December 1962, he was attached with the Attorney General's Chambers in Kuala Lumpur as Deputy Public Prosecutor, Federation of Malaya. In February 1963, he was the Secretary to Brunei Delegation at negotiations on merger with Malaysia. Later, he was appointed Assistant Attorney General in September 1965. Appointed as Deputy Attorney General in January 1968, functioned as Attorney General on many occasions when the Attorney General wasn't present. Given the title of Pehin Orang Kaya Laila Setia Bakti Di-Raja in May 1968.

Appointed as Deputy Menteri Besar (Deputy Chief Minister) in October 1970. Awarded the position of Special Adviser to His Majesty the Sultan and Yang Di-Pertuan of Brunei Darussalam in October 1971. Chairman of Royal Brunei Airlines from its founding in November 1974 to January 1984. From October 1986 until 24 May 2005, Pehin Isa served as the Minister of Home Affairs and Special Adviser to His Majesty the Sultan and Yang Di-Pertuan of Brunei Darussalam. On behalf of Brunei's Government, Isa Ibrahim and on behalf of the Malaysian Government, Mohamed Rahmat signed a Memorandum of understanding (MoU) on Cooperation in the Field of Information and Broadcasting on 14 February 1992.

From 1 March 2011 to 11 March 2015, he was appointed as the Legislative Council's speaker. Pehin Isa has took on the role of Minister at the Primce Minister's Office since 30 January 2018, in which he had remained at post through the 2023 council reappointment.

Personal life 
Married to Datin Seri Utama Hajjah Rosnah binti Abdullah (Seri Laila Pengiring Di-Raja), and they have five kids; two sons and three daughters. His hobbies include photography and golf.

Bibliography

Honours 
Isa Ibrahim has earned the following honours;

National 

  Order of Laila Utama First Class (DK) – Dato Laila Utama
  Order of Seri Paduka Mahkota Brunei First Class (SPMB) – Dato Seri Paduka
  Order of Setia Negara Brunei Second Class (DSNB) – Dato Setia
  Sultan Hassanal Bolkiah Medal (PHBS)
  Armed Forces Service Medal (PBLI)
  Meritorious Service Medal (PJK)
  Long Service Medal (PKL)

Foreign 
 :
  Order of the British Empire Officer (OBE) – (1969)
  Royal Victorian Order Commander (CVO) – (February 1972)

References 

Living people
1935 births
Speakers of Legislative Council of Brunei
Government ministers of Brunei